Talk Amongst the Trees is the third album from Portland, Oregon ambient musician Matthew Cooper, under the name Eluvium. The album is characterised by evocative ambient guitar work and features liberal use of loop/hold pedals to create lush/abstract guitar textures. The front cover is the painting "November" by Quint Buchholz.

Track listing
 "New Animals from the Air" - 10:47
 "Show Us Our Homes" - 4:46
 "Area 41" - 0:59
 "Everything to Come" - 5:40
 "Calm of the Cast-Light Cloud" - 5:30
 "Taken" - 16:56
 "We Say Goodbye to Ourselves" - 2:09
 "One" - 7:44

References

2005 albums
Eluvium (musician) albums
Temporary Residence Limited albums